Charlotte Ellen Radcliffe (3 August 1903 – 12 December 1979) was an English competitive swimmer from Liverpool who competed for Great Britain in the 1920 Summer Olympics.

In the 1920 Olympics in Antwerp, Belgium, at age 17, she won a silver medal in the 4×100-metre freestyle relay, in which she swam the third leg of the race.  She finished seventh in her first heat of 100-metre freestyle event and did not advance.

She is the great aunt of long-distance runner Paula Radcliffe.

See also
 List of Olympic medalists in swimming (women)

References

External links

1903 births
1979 deaths
English female swimmers
English female freestyle swimmers
Swimmers at the 1920 Summer Olympics
Olympic silver medallists for Great Britain
Olympic swimmers of Great Britain
Medalists at the 1920 Summer Olympics
Olympic silver medalists in swimming
Sportspeople from Liverpool
People from Garston
20th-century English women